Together in Vegas is a co-headlined concert residency with American country music recordings artists, Reba McEntire and Brooks & Dunn. The show marks the reunion of Brooks & Dunns since their breakup in 2010. It features the biggest hits by both artist, including their duets. The residency started in June 2015. 

The shows in 2015 grossed over $9 million, ranking 104th on Pollstar's "Top 200 North American Tours".

Background
The tour was announced during a Q&A session being McEntire, Brooks and Dunn, on December 3, 2014. Brooks & Dunn reunited after a suggestion from McEntire about the forthcoming Vegas show. The show marks the third time the trio have toured together. Brooks & Dunn served as the opening act on McEntire's "It's Your Call Tour". In 1997, they co-headlined a concert tour lasting until 1999. During an interview with Country Weekly, Kix Brooks stated planning had not started for the show (in February 2016), however McEntire was cracking the whip to get things done. In an interview with Billboard described the show as "collaborative" with both acts on stage together with a few solo numbers. 

"It's going to be a good show. I know it is. I feel it in my bones. Everybody feels good about it. We love it, but that's not saying after we get under the lights and onto the huge stage we don't change a few things, but for now we're at a good place with it."

Setlist
This setlist is obtained from the concert held on June 19, 2015. It does not represent all shows during the residency.
Brooks & Dunn/McEntire
"Play Something Country"
"Why Haven't I Heard from You"
"Little Miss Honky Tonk" / "Consider Me Gone" / "Mama Don't Get Dressed Up for Nothing" / "Little Rock" / "Put a Girl in It" / "Can't Even Get the Blues"
Brooks and Dunn
"Red Dirt Road"
"Brand New Man"
"Neon Moon"
McEntire
"The Night the Lights Went Out in Georgia"
"Going Out Like That"
"Whoever's in New England"
Brooks & Dunn
"Ain't Nothing 'bout You"
"Hillbilly Deluxe"
"Rock My World (Little Country Girl)"
Brooks & Dunn/McEntire
"Cowgirls Don't Cry"
"You're Gonna Miss Me When I'm Gone"
"If You See Him/If You See Her"
McEntire
"The Fear of Being Alone"
"You Lie" / "For My Broken Heart" / "And Still"
"Is There Life Out There"
Brooks and Dunn
"Believe"
McEntire
"Turn On the Radio"
"I'm a Survivor"
Brooks & Dunn
"Boot Scootin' Boogie"
"My Maria"
McEntire
"Fancy"
Brooks & Dunn/McEntire
"Only in America

Shows

References 

2015 concert residencies
2016 concert residencies
2017 concert residencies
2018 concert residencies
Co-headlining concert tours
Reba McEntire concert tours
concert residencies in the Las Vegas Valley
Caesars Palace